Ragland is an unincorporated community just outside the town of Delbarton on the Mingo and Logan County border in the U.S. state of West Virginia. Ragland is home to the Coal Mac mining complex and the Ragland Church of Christ.

The community most likely was named after the local Ragland family.

References

Unincorporated communities in Mingo County, West Virginia
Unincorporated communities in West Virginia
Coal towns in West Virginia